Wellings is a surname. Notable people with the surname include:

Andy Wellings, English computer scientist
Barry Wellings (born 1958), English footballer
Bob Wellings (1934–2022), English television presenter
Eloise Wellings (born 1982), Australian long-distance runner
Evelyn Wellings (1909–1992), English cricketer and journalist
Helen Wellings, Australian consumer advocate and television presenter
Paul Wellings (born 1953), English ecologist
Peter Wellings (born 1970), English cricketer